Arnhem is an electoral division of the Legislative Assembly in Australia's Northern Territory. It was first created in 1974, and takes its name from Arnhem Land, the region encompassing much of the northern part of the Territory.

Arnhem includes the Arnhem Land towns of Barunga, Beswick, Mataranka, Jabiru and Kakadu. In the redistribution before the 2016 election, gained territory from Arafura and Stuart, while losing territory to Nhulunbuy. There were 5,431 people enrolled within the electorate as of August 2020.

Arnhem was one of the initial electorates created along with the introduction of the Legislative Assembly in 1974. Though it consisted of predominantly indigenous towns which voted strongly for the Labor Party at a federal level, it was won by the Country Liberal Party amidst their landslide victory at the election of that year, in which the Labor Party won no seats. Arnhem returned to expectations at the 1977 election, when it was won by Labor candidate Bob Collins, who was elected leader of the party in 1981. After much of the northern portion of the seat was transferred to the new seat of Arafura in 1983, Collins transferred there and was succeeded in Arafura by new Labor candidate Wes Lanhupuy. Lanhupuy was comfortably re-elected three times, but died suddenly in 1995.

Labor candidate Jack Ah Kit won the 1995 by-election resulting from Lanhupuy's death, and went on to serve as a Cabinet minister in the Martin government from 2001. He retired at the 2005 election, with former ABC TV presenter Barbara McCarthy being comfortably elected as his replacement.  McCarthy was reelected unopposed in 2008, only to be ousted by the CLP's Larisa Lee in 2012 as the CLP swept into government.  Lee herself sat under three different banners during the next parliament, leaving the CLP to sit as an independent, joining the Palmer United Party, before returning to be an independent.  Selena Uibo regained the seat for Labor at the 2016 election. Lee won only 117 votes or 4.0 percent, finishing in fifth and last place.

The high proportion of indigenous people in the Arnhem population has been reflected in the seat having had five consecutive indigenous MPs, and McCarthy (now a Senator) having been an outspoken advocate of indigenous rights in parliament.

Members for Arnhem

Election results

Notes

References

External links
 Division profile from the Northern Territory Electoral Commission

Arnhem